Victoria Chang is an American poet, writer, editor, and critic.

Life
Victoria Chang was born in Detroit, Michigan, and raised in the suburb of West Bloomfield. Her parents were immigrants from Taiwan. She graduated from the University of Michigan with a BA in Asian Studies, Harvard University with an MA in Asian Studies, and Stanford Business School with a MBA.  She also has an MFA in poetry from the Warren Wilson MFA Program for Writers where she held a Holden Scholarship. She lives in Los Angeles.

Career
Chang’s forthcoming book of poems, With My Back to the World, will be published by Farrar, Straus and Giroux in 2024. 

Chang's first book, Circle (Southern Illinois University Press, 2005), won the Crab Orchard Series in Poetry. Her second poetry collection is Salvinia Molesta (University of Georgia Press, 2008). Her third book of poetry, The Boss was published by McSweeney's in 2013—it won a PEN Center USA literary award and a California Book Award. Another collection, Barbie Chang, was published by Copper Canyon Press in 2017.

Her fifth book of poems, OBIT, was published by Copper Canyon Press in 2020. It won the Los Angeles Times Book Prize, the PEN Voelcker Award, and the Anisfield-Wolf Book Prize and was a finalist for National Book Critics Circle Award, the Griffin Poetry Prize, and long listed for the National Book Award. It was also named a New York Times Notable Book, a New York Times Best 100 Books of the Year, a TIME Magazine, NPR, Boston Globe, and Publishers Weekly Best Book of the Year.

In 2021, she published Dear Memory: Letters on Writing, Silence, and Grief, Milkweed Editions. The book was a TIME, Lithub, and NPR most anticipated book of 2021. It was named one of Electric Literature’s Favorite Nonfiction Books of 2021. 

Her sixth book of poems, The Trees Witness Everything, was published by Copper Canyon Press in 2022. It was named a Best Book of 2022 by The New Yorker. 

She also writes picture books for children and middle grade novels, and her picture book, Is Mommy? published by Beach Lane Books (Simon & Schuster) in the fall of 2015, illustrated by Marla Frazee, was named a New York Times Notable Book. Her middle grade verse novel, LOVE, LOVE was published by Sterling Publishing in 2020.

Chang is the former Program Chair of Antioch University's MFA Program and currently serves as a Core Faculty member. She was awarded a Guggenheim Fellowship in 2017, a Lannan Residency Fellowship in 2020, a Sustainable Arts Foundation Fellowship in 2017, a Poetry Society of America Alice Fay di Castagnola Award in 2018, a Pushcart Prize, and a MacDowell Fellowship. Her work has appeared in literary journals and magazines including The Paris Review, The Kenyon Review, Gulf Coast, Virginia Quarterly Review, Slate, Ploughshares, and The Nation, and Tin House.

Honors and awards
Dear Memory was named one of Electric Literature’s Favorite Nonfiction Books of 2022
OBIT won the 2021 Anisfield-Wolf Book Award for poetry
OBIT won the 2020 Los Angeles Times Poetry Book Prize
OBIT was a finalist for a National Book Critics Circle Award 
OBIT won the PEN Voelcker Award
OBIT was long listed for a National Book Award
OBIT was a finalist for the Griffin International Poetry Prize
OBIT was named a New York Times 100 Best Books of the Year, a TIME Magazine Best 100 Books of the Year, NPR's Best Books of the Year, Publishers Weekly Best Books of the Year, Boston Globe Best Books of the Year
2020 Lannan Foundation Residency Fellowship
2020 Frank Sanchez Book Award
2019 MacDowell Katherine Min Fellowship
2017 Pushcart Prize
2018 Housatonic Book Award for Barbie Chang
Poetry Society of America's Alice Fay di Castagnola Award 2017
Sustainable Arts Foundation Fellowship 2017
Guggenheim Fellowship 2017
IS MOMMY? named a New York Times Notable Book in 2015
2014, The Boss winner of a 2014 PEN Center USA Literary Award
 2014, The Boss winner of a 2013 Commonwealth California Book Award (Silver Medal)
 2004 Crab Orchard Review Open Competition Award
 Salvinia  Molesta Finalist for the 2008 Commonwealth California Book Award
 Circle, Winner of the Association for Asian American Studies Book award
 Circle, finalist for the PEN Center West Book Award
 2007 Ploughshares Cohen Award
 2005 Bread Loaf Writers' Conference Fellowship
 2005 Sewanee Writers' Conference Fellowship
 2003 Bread Loaf Writers' Conference Scholarship

Published works
Poetry Collections
The Trees Witness Everything, Copper Canyon Press, 2022
OBIT, Copper Canyon Press, 2020
 Barbie Chang, Copper Canyon Press, 2017
 The Boss, McSweeney's Poetry Series, 2014
 
 

Prose Books
Dear Memory: Letters on Writing, Silence, and Grief, Milkweed Editions, 2021

Children's Books
 Love Love, Sterling Books, 2020
 

Anthologies Edited
 

Anthology Publications
 Tracy K. Smith; David Lehman, eds. (2021). "Obit". The Best American Poetry 2021. Simon and Schuster.
 Paisley Rekdal; David Lehman, eds. (2020). "Obit". The Best American Poetry 2020. Simon and Schuster.
Major Jackson; David Lehman, eds. (2019). Six poems from OBIT. The Best American Poetry 2019. Simon and Schuster. 

Pushcart Prize Anthology, 2018

References

External links
 Author's Website
National Book Award: https://www.nationalbook.org/books/obit/ 
 Interview: every other day > 13 June 2006 > Victoria Chang Interview
 Audio: Victoria Chang Reading for From the Fishouse
 "Drawing New Circles:  Dialogue with Victoria Chang", Emprise Review
 
 
  
 

Year of birth missing (living people)
Living people
American bloggers
American management consultants
American writers of Taiwanese descent
American women writers of Chinese descent
American poets of Asian descent
Harvard Graduate School of Arts and Sciences alumni
Stanford Graduate School of Business alumni
University of Michigan College of Literature, Science, and the Arts alumni
Writers from Detroit
American women poets
21st-century American women